The Wong Laundry Building is an historic building in Portland, Oregon's Old Town Chinatown neighborhood, United States. The two-story structure was completed in 1908, and sold in 2016. It was named one of Oregon's Most Endangered Places.

See also

 List of Oregon's Most Endangered Places
 Troy Laundry Building (Portland, Oregon)
 Yale Union Laundry Building

References

External links
Restore Oregon record for the Wong Laundry Building

1908 establishments in Oregon
Buildings and structures completed in 1908
Buildings and structures in Portland, Oregon
Former laundry buildings
Northwest Portland, Oregon
Old Town Chinatown
Oregon's Most Endangered Places